Five Points, Ohio may refer to:

 Five Points, Champaign County, Ohio
 Five Points, Pickaway County, Ohio
 Five Points (Toledo), in Toledo, Ohio
 Five Points, Warren County, Ohio

See also
 Five Points (disambiguation)